Tallysson Lucas Souza Duarte Vasconcelos or simply Tallysson (born 17 July 1995) is a Brazilian professional footballer who plays as a centre-back for PSS Sleman.

References

1995 births
Living people
Brazilian footballers
Brazilian expatriate footballers
Brazilian expatriate sportspeople in Indonesia
Brazilian expatriate sportspeople in Kuwait